Stéphane Beauregard (born January 10, 1968) is a Canadian former professional ice hockey goaltender who played five seasons in the National Hockey League (NHL) for the Winnipeg Jets and Philadelphia Flyers.

Playing career
As a youth, he played in the 1981 Quebec International Pee-Wee Hockey Tournament with a minor ice hockey team from Saint-Jean-sur-Richelieu.

Drafted by the Winnipeg Jets in the third round, 52nd overall, in the 1988 NHL Entry Draft from the St. Jean Castors. In the 1992 off-season, he was traded three times, first to the Buffalo Sabres for Christian Ruuttu and future considerations on June 15, then to the Chicago Blackhawks for Dominik Hašek and future considerations (draft pick Éric Dazé) on August 10, and finally back to Winnipeg for Ruuttu. On October 1 of the same year, he was traded to the Philadelphia Flyers for future considerations. He was then traded back to the Jets by the Flyers for future considerations, June 11, 1993.

Most of his career was spent in the minor leagues. Guy Lafleur was his childhood idol.

He also played for the San Francisco Spiders in their only season of existence (1995–96), ultimately winning the James Gatschene Memorial Trophy as regular-season most valuable player.

Beauregard filled in for an injured Wendell Young to lead the Chicago Wolves to their first Turner Cup in 1997-98.

Career statistics

References

External links
 

1968 births
Canadian ice hockey goaltenders
Chicago Wolves (IHL) players
Fort Wayne Komets players
French Quebecers
HC Davos players
Hershey Bears players
Living people
Moncton Hawks players
People from Cowansville
Philadelphia Flyers players
Quebec Rafales players
Saint-Jean Castors players
San Francisco Spiders players
Schwenninger Wild Wings players
Springfield Falcons players
Winnipeg Jets (1979–1996) draft picks
Winnipeg Jets (1979–1996) players
Canadian expatriate ice hockey players in Germany
Canadian expatriate ice hockey players in Switzerland